Elmar Theveßen (born 3 June 1967) is a German journalist and author.

Life 
Born in Viersen, Theveßen studied Theveßen history, political science and German studies at the University of Bonn. Foreign Policy and journalism he studied at American University in Washington, D.C.. From 1991 to 1995 Theveßen was tv-journalist for politics in ZDF-studio Bonn. Until 2001 Theveßen worked as tv-journalist for ZD-studio in Washington, D.C. From 2001 to 2002 he worked as tv-journalist for Frontal21 at ZDF. Since 2003 Theveßen was managing editor for ZDF-studio „Aktuelles" in Berlin. Since March 2019 Theveßen is director of ZDF-studio in Washington. D.C.
Theveßen is expert for terrorism on German broadcaster ZDF for example 2016 Chemnitz terrorism plot. Theveßen is member of Atlantik-Brücke.

Literature 
 2002: Schläfer mitten unter uns. Droemer, München 2002; aktualisierte Taschenbuchausgabe: Knaur, Munich 2004, .
 2004: Die Bush-Bilanz. Wie der US-Präsident sein Land und die Welt betrogen hat. Droemer, München 2004, .
 2005: Terroralarm. Deutschland und die islamistische Bedrohung. Rowohlt Berlin, Berlin 2005, .
 2009: Al-Qaida. Wissen was stimmt. Herder, Freiburg im Breisgau 2009, .
 2011: Nine-Eleven. Der Tag, der die Welt veränderte. Propyläen, Berlin 2011, .
 2016: Terror in Deutschland. Die tödliche Strategie der Islamisten. Piper, München 2016, .

Awards 
 1994: Medienpreis by German Bundestag
 1996: Nominination for Telestar
 1998, 2002, 2003: radio-, tv- and New-Media-Award by RIAS-Commission
 2011: Bul le Mérite by Bundes Deutscher Kriminalbeamter
 2012: Deutscher Fernsehpreis for documentation 9/11

References

External links 

 

1967 births
People from Viersen
German television reporters and correspondents
German broadcast news analysts
German political journalists
German male journalists
ZDF people
Living people